The Cereda Pass (1361 m) is a high mountain pass in the southern Dolomites between the provinces of Trentino and Belluno in Italy.

It connects Agordo in the Cordevole valley and Fiera di Primiero. The pass road has a maximum grade of 15%.

The Dolomite Highway 2 traverses the pass.

See also
 List of highest paved roads in Europe
 List of mountain passes

Cereda